The Yser Medal was a Belgian campaign medal of World War I, established on 18 October 1918 to denote distinguished service during the 1914 Battle of the Yser in which the Belgian Army stopped the German advance of the German invasion of Belgium.

Statute
The Yser Medal was awarded to the members of the Belgian Armed Forces who were part of the army fighting along the Yser river between 17 and 31 October 1914 that proved themselves worthy of the distinction.  The medal could also be awarded to foreign nationals, members of allied military forces who took part in the Battle of the Yser.  The medal could be awarded posthumously.

The Yser Medal was worn on the left side of the chest and when in the presence of other awards of Belgium, was placed directly after the Croix de Guerre (War Cross).

Medal description
The Yser medal was a 35 mm in diameter circular medal struck from bronze and surmounted by a smaller diameter green enameled medallion.  The obverse bore a nude, helmeted man holding a lance (indicating the halting of the advance of the German forces), to his right, the relief inscription on three lines "17-31 OCT 1914".  In the enameled medallion, the relief inscription "YSER".  The reverse bore the relief image of the left side of a roaring wounded lion lying on the bank of the Yser river, an arrow in his left shoulder, below the lion, the relief inscription "YSER", in the medallion, the Belgian royal crown over the relief letter "A", the monogram of King Albert.

The medal was suspended by a ring through the suspension loop to a red silk moiré ribbon with wide black edge stripes.  The red denoting the spilled blood, the black denoting the mourning.

Notable recipients (partial list)
The individuals listed below were awarded the Yser medal:
 King Albert I of Belgium.
Aviator Lieutenant Colonel Baron Willy Coppens
Lieutenant General Alphonse Ferdinand Tromme
Lieutenant General Jules Joseph Pire
Cavalry Lieutenant General Sir Maximilien de Neve de Roden
Cavalry Lieutenant General Baron Victor Van Strijdonck de Burkel
Lieutenant General Georges Deffontaine
Lieutenant General Baron Raoul de Hennin de Boussu-Walcourt
Lieutenant General Joseph Leroy
Lieutenant General Robert Oor
Lieutenant General Libert Elie Thomas
Lieutenant General Léon Bievez
Cavalry Major General Baron Beaudoin de Maere d’Aertrycke
Major General Jean Buysse
Major General Paul Jacques
Police Lieutenant General Louis Joseph Leroy
Police Lieutenant General Oscar-Eugène Dethise
Chaplain General Louis Kerremans
Lieutenant General Harry Jungbluth
Cavalry Lieutenant General Baron Albert du Roy de Blicquy
Lieutenant General Baron Émile Dossin de Saint-Georges
Lieutenant General Baron Honoré Drubbel
Lieutenant General Victor Bertrand
Lieutenant General Baron Jules Jacques de Dixmude
Lieutenant General Georges Guiette
Lieutenant General Albert Lantonnois van Rode
Lieutenant General Baron Armand de Ceuninck
Lieutenant General Aloïs Biebuyck
Cavalry Lieutenant General Baron Léon de Witte de Haelen
Cavalry Lieutenant General Vicount Victor Buffin de Chosal
Cavalry Lieutenant General Jules De Blauwe
Major General Doctor Antoine Depage
Lieutenant General Baron Ferdinand de Posch 
Cavalry Lieutenant General Count André de Jonghe d’Ardoye

Yser Cross

The Yser Medal was replaced by the Yser Cross in 1934.  The cross was of similar design to the medal displaying the same obverse and reverse except that it was in the form of a cross pattée.  The Yser Cross was issued as a replacement to the earlier Yser Medal upon application and payment of a fee, consequently relatively few were issued as few veterans wanted to trade in their medal, and even fewer wanted to pay the fee.  The Yser Medal and the Yser Cross could not be worn together, it was one or the other.  Although issued with the same black and red ribbon as the Yser medal, many Flemish recipients opted for an unofficial black and yellow ribbon identifying them as Dutch speaking Belgians.

See also

Battle of the Yser
Race to the Sea
World War I
List of Orders, Decorations and Medals of the Kingdom of Belgium

References

Other sources
 Quinot H., 1950, Recueil illustré des décorations belges et congolaises, 4e Edition. (Hasselt)
 Cornet R., 1982, Recueil des dispositions légales et réglementaires régissant les ordres nationaux belges. 2e Ed. N.pl.,  (Brussels)
 Borné A.C., 1985, Distinctions honorifiques de la Belgique, 1830-1985 (Brussels)

External links
Bibliothèque royale de Belgique (In French)
Les Ordres Nationaux Belges (In French)
ARS MORIENDI Notables from Belgian history (In French and Dutch)

Orders, decorations, and medals of Belgium
Awards established in 1918
1918 establishments in Belgium